Argyle Airport  is an airport at Lake Argyle, Western Australia. The airport serves the nearby Argyle Diamond Mine.

See also
 List of airports in Western Australia
 Aviation transport in Australia

References

External links
 Airservices Aerodromes & Procedure Charts

Kimberley airports